Johnny Allen may refer to:
Johnny Allen (arranger) (1917–2014), American R&B arranger
Johnny Allen (baseball) (1904–1959), Major League Baseball player
Johnny Allen (boxer); see Curtis Sheppard
Johnny Allen (racing driver) (born 1934), NASCAR driver, 1955–1967
Johnny Allen (American football) (1933–2010), American football player
Johnny Allen (EastEnders), a fictional character in the BBC soap opera
Johnny Allen Hendrix or Jimi Hendrix, (1942–1970), American rock guitarist

See also
John Allen (disambiguation)
Jonny Allan (born 1983), English footballer